Gated recurrent units (GRUs) are a gating mechanism in recurrent neural networks, introduced in 2014 by Kyunghyun Cho et al. The GRU is like a long short-term memory (LSTM) with a forget gate, but has fewer parameters than LSTM, as it lacks an output gate. 
GRU's performance on certain tasks of polyphonic music modeling, speech signal modeling and natural language processing was found to be similar to that of LSTM. GRUs shown that gating is indeed helpful in general and Bengio's team concluding that no concrete conclusion on which of the two gating units was better.

Architecture 

There are several variations on the full gated unit, with gating done using the previous hidden state and the bias in various combinations, and a simplified form called minimal gated unit.

The operator  denotes the Hadamard product in the following.

Fully gated unit 

Variables
 : input vector
 : output vector
 : candidate activation vector
 : update gate vector
 : reset gate vector
 ,  and : parameter matrices and vector

Activation functions
 : The original is a sigmoid function.
: The original is a hyperbolic tangent.
Alternative activation functions are possible, provided that .

Alternate forms can be created by changing  and 
  Type 1, each gate depends only on the previous hidden state and the bias.
 
  Type 2, each gate depends only on  the previous hidden state.
 
  Type 3, each gate is computed using only the bias.

Minimal gated unit 
The minimal gated unit is similar to the fully gated unit, except the update and reset gate vector is merged into a forget gate. This also implies that the equation for the output vector must be changed:

Variables
 : input vector
 : output vector
 : candidate activation vector
 : forget vector
 ,  and : parameter matrices and vector

Learning Algorithm Recommendation Framework 

A Learning Algorithm Recommendation Framework may help guiding the selection of learning algorithm and scientific discipline (e.g. RNN, GAN, RL, CNN,...). The framework has the advantage of having been generated from an extensive analysis of the literature and dedicated to recurrent neural networks and their variations.

References

Artificial neural networks